In mathematics, a multiply perfect number (also called multiperfect number or pluperfect number) is a generalization of a perfect number.

As of 2014,  numbers are known for each value of k up to 11.

It is unknown whether there are any odd multiply perfect numbers other than 1. The first few multiply perfect numbers are:
1, 6, 28, 120, 496, 672, 8128, 30240, 32760, 523776, 2178540, 23569920, 33550336, 45532800, 142990848, 459818240, ... .

Example 
The sum of the divisors of 120 is
1 + 2 + 3 + 4 + 5 + 6 + 8 + 10 + 12 + 15 + 20 + 24 + 30 + 40 + 60 + 120 = 360
which is 3 × 120. Therefore 120 is a  number.

Smallest known k-perfect numbers 

The following table gives an overview of the smallest known  numbers for k ≤ 11 :

Properties 

It can be proven that:

This implies that an integer n is a  number divisible by 2 but not by 4, if and only if n/2 is an odd perfect number, of which none are known.

Odd multiply perfect numbers 

It is unknown whether there are any odd multiply perfect numbers other than 1. However if an odd  number n exists where k > 2, then it must satisfy the following conditions:
 The largest prime factor is ≥ 100129
 The second largest prime factor is ≥ 1009
 The third largest prime factor is ≥ 101

Bounds 

Under the assumption of the Riemann hypothesis, the following inequality is true for all  numbers n, where k > 3

where  is Euler's gamma constant. This can be proven using Robin's theorem.

The number of divisors τ(n) of a  number n satisfies the inequality

The number of distinct prime factors ω(n) of n satisfies

Specific values of k
Perfect numbers

A number n with σ(n) = 2n is perfect.

Triperfect numbers
A number n with σ(n) = 3n is triperfect. There are only six known triperfect numbers and these are believed to comprise all such numbers:

 120, 672, 523776, 459818240, 1476304896, 51001180160 

If there exists an odd perfect number m (a famous open problem) then 2m would be , since σ(2m) = σ(2)&hairsp;σ(m) = 3×2m. An odd triperfect number must be a square number exceeding 1070 and have at least 12 distinct prime factors, the largest exceeding 105.

Variations
Unitary multiply perfect numbers
A similar extension can be made for unitary perfect numbers. A positive integer n is called a unitary multi  number if σ*(n) = kn where σ*(n) is the sum of its unitary divisors. (A divisor d of a number n is a unitary divisor if d and n/d share no common factors.). 

A unitary multiply perfect number is simply a unitary multi  number for some positive integer k. Equivalently, unitary multiply perfect numbers are those n for which n divides σ*(n). A unitary multi  number is naturally called a unitary perfect number. In the case k > 2, no example of a unitary multi  number is yet known. It is known that if such a number exists, it must be even and greater than 10102 and must have more than forty four odd prime factors. This problem is probably very difficult to settle. The concept of unitary divisor was originally due to R. Vaidyanathaswamy (1931) who called such a divisor as block factor. The present terminology is due to E. Cohen (1960).

The first few unitary multiply perfect numbers are:
1, 6, 60, 90, 87360 

Bi-unitary multiply perfect numbers

A positive integer n is called a bi-unitary multi  number  if σ**(n) = kn where σ**(n) is the sum of its bi-unitary divisors. This concept is due to Peter Hagis (1987). A bi-unitary multiply perfect number is simply a bi-unitary multi  number for some positive integer k. Equivalently, bi-unitary multiply perfect numbers are those n for which n divides σ**(n). A bi-unitary multi  number is naturally called a bi-unitary perfect number, and a bi-unitary multi  number is called a bi-unitary triperfect number.

A divisor d of a positive integer n is called a bi-unitary divisor''' of n if the greatest common unitary divisor (gcud) of d and n/d equals 1. This concept  is due to D. Surynarayana (1972). The sum of the (positive) bi-unitary divisors of n is denoted by σ**(n). 

Peter Hagis (1987) proved that there are no odd bi-unitary multiperfect numbers other than 1. Haukkanen and Sitaramaiah (2020) found all bi-unitary triperfect numbers of the form 2au where 1 ≤ a ≤ 6 and u is odd, and partially the case where a = 7.

Further, they fixed completely the case a'' = 8.

The first few bi-unitary multiply perfect numbers are:
1, 6, 60, 90, 120, 672, 2160, 10080, 22848, 30240

References

Sources

See also 

 Hemiperfect number

External links 
 The Multiply Perfect Numbers page
 The Prime Glossary: Multiply perfect numbers
 

Arithmetic dynamics
Divisor function
Integer sequences
Perfect numbers